The Embassy of Germany in London is the diplomatic mission of Germany in the United Kingdom. The embassy is located at Belgrave Square, in Belgravia. It occupies three of the original terraced houses in Belgrave Square and a late 20th-century extension.

History 

The Prussian Consul-General was housed at 9 Carlton House Terrace in the so-called Prussia House. During Hans Wesemann's 1936 trial over the kidnapping of pacifist writer Berthold Jacob from Basel, Switzerland, Wesemann admitted that the German Embassy in London had been used as a base for the activities of the Gestapo, the Nazi secret State police. In 1937, Ambassador Joachim von Ribbentrop hosted 1,000 people, including Prince George, Duke of Kent and his wife, Maria, Duchess of Kent, at the reopening of the Embassy at Carlton House Terrace which had undergone a £100,000 renovation. In September 1939, the German Embassy burned its files following the onset of World War II.

Post World War II
After World War II Prussia House was requisitioned as enemy property, furniture and the works of art were sold in separate auctions. The Federal Republic of Germany moved its consulate and diplomatic operations to Belgrave Square, still operating as a consulate general.  The consulate became a fully functional embassy in June 1951, the FRG leasing the building for 99 years in 1953. In the 1960s, the West German Embassy was the site of Jewish War veterans who were protesting signs in Germany of a revival of anti-Semitism.

In the 1970s, office space in the embassy was tight so an extension was erected at Chesham Place, inaugurated in 1978. It won the Westminster City Council prize for architecture.

In 1990, after German reunification, the East German embassy building at 34 Belgrave Square became part of the German embassy.

List of German ambassadors to the United Kingdom

Gallery

References

External links 

 Official site
 German Foreign Office

London
Germany
Buildings and structures in the City of Westminster
Germany–United Kingdom relations
Belgravia